Lisa A. Lindstrom (August 12, 1912 – June 22, 1994), also known by her married name Lisa Olson, was an American competition swimmer who represented the United States at the 1928 Summer Olympics in Amsterdam.  As a 16-year-old, Lindstrom finished fifth in the event final of the women's 100-meter backstroke with a time of 1:24.4.

References

1912 births
1994 deaths
American female backstroke swimmers
Olympic swimmers of the United States
Sportspeople from Jersey City, New Jersey
Swimmers at the 1928 Summer Olympics
20th-century American women
20th-century American people